James C. Smith may refer to:
 James C. Smith (politician), American lawyer and Secretary of State of Florida 
 James C. Smith (general), United States Army general
 Jim Smith (business executive) (James C. Smith), American business executive

See also
 James Smith (disambiguation)